Corick is a megalithic site and townland in the civil parish of Ballynascreen, County Londonderry, Northern Ireland. It includes a stone circle and a stone row. The Corick stone circles and alignments are located 2 km north east of Ballybriest court-tomb, 400 metres south of Corick clachan, near a stream. The stone alignments and circle are Scheduled Historic Monuments in Corick at grid reference: Area of H780 896.

Function
Although it is often believed the stone monuments were intentially aligned to serve a greater purpose, the crudeness of the stones means that they could not have been used as advanced astronomical calculators. Their positioning therefore is more likely symbolic rather than functional.

See also
 List of archaeological sites in County Londonderry

External links

References

Archaeological sites in County Londonderry
Stone circles in Northern Ireland
Scheduled monuments in Northern Ireland
Prehistoric sites in Northern Ireland
Townlands of County Londonderry